is a retired Japanese male volleyball player and was part of the Japan men's national volleyball team. He started to be the head coach for JTEKT Stings in V.League Division 1 since 2018–19 season until 2020–21 season. He led the team won the first V.League 1 title of the club's history in 2020 and the Emperor's Cup title in 2021. Currently, he is being a management staff of the team.

Awards

Personal 
 2019–20 V.League 1 — Yasutaka Matsudaira Award (松平康隆賞), given to the coach of the championship team, with JTEKT Stings
 2019–20 V.League 1 — Director Award, with JTEKT Stings

Coaching club teams 
 2019–20 V.League 1 —  Champion, with JTEKT Stings
 2020–21 Japanese Emperor's Cup —  Champion, with JTEKT Stings

Personal life
His younger brother, Kozo Takahashi, was also a part of Japan men's national volleyball team and he already retired.

References

External links
 profile at FIVB.org

1980 births
Living people
Japanese men's volleyball players
Sportspeople from Tokyo Metropolis
21st-century Japanese people